The 2020 Tour de Wallonie (known as the VOO–Tour de Wallonie for sponsorship reasons) was a four-stage men's professional road cycling race mainly held in the Belgian region of Wallonia. It was a 2.Pro race as part of the 2020 UCI Europe Tour and the inaugural 2020 UCI ProSeries. It was the forty-seventh edition of the Tour de Wallonie, starting on 16 August in Soignies and finishing on 19 August in Érezée. It was originally scheduled for 27 – 31 July, but due to the COVID-19 pandemic, it was postponed to mid-August after the UCI's May calendar update and was shortened from five stages like in years prior to four stages.

Schedule

Teams
Twenty-three teams, consisting of nine UCI WorldTeams, nine UCI ProTeams, and five UCI Continental teams participated in the race.

UCI WorldTeams

 
 
 
 
 
 
 
 
 

UCI ProTeams

 
 
 
 
 
 
 
 
 

UCI Continental Teams

Stages

Stage 1

Stage 2
17 August 2020 — Frasnes-lez-Anvaing to Wavre,

Stage 3
18 August 2020 — Plombières to Visé,

Stage 4
19 August 2020 — Blegny to Érezée,

Classification leadership table

 On stage two, Arvid de Kleijn, who was fourth in the points classification, wore the green jersey, because first placed Caleb Ewan wore the yellow jersey as leader of the general classification, second placed Sam Bennett wore the Irish national champions' jersey as the defending Irish national road race champion, and third placed Tim Merlier wore the Belgian national champions' jersey as the defending Belgian national road race champion.
 On stage three, Arnaud Démare, who was second in the points classification, wore the green jersey, because first placed Caleb Ewan wore the yellow jersey as leader of the general classification.
 On stage four, Caleb Ewan, who was second in the points classification, wore the green jersey, because first placed Arnaud Démare wore the yellow jersey as leader of the general classification.

Final classification standings

General classification

Points classification

Mountains classification

Sprints classification

Young rider classification

Teams classification

References

External links
  

2020
2020 UCI Europe Tour
2020 UCI ProSeries
2020 in Belgian sport
Cycling events postponed due to the COVID-19 pandemic
August 2020 sports events in Belgium